Bakhtiyar R. Tuzmukhamedov (born March 30, 1955) is a Russian international lawyer, who served as a judge at the International Criminal Tribunal for Rwanda until its closure on December 31, 2015.

Biography
Tuzmukhamedov attended the Moscow State Institute of International Relations, graduating in 1977. In 1983, he was conferred with a degree of the Candidate of Juridical Science. His candidate dissertation covered UN work with regard to the Indian Ocean peace zone proposal. In 1994, he received an LL.M. from Harvard Law School.

Professional life
A longtime professor of international Law at the Diplomatic Academy in Moscow, he has also served as a research fellow, senior research fellow, and associate professor of international Law at the academy.

He is a member of the Crimes Against Humanity Initiative Advisory Council, a project of the Whitney R. Harris World Law Institute at  Washington University School of Law in St. Louis to establish the world’s first treaty on the prevention and punishment of crimes against humanity.

References
Harvard Law School.  Bakhtiyar R. Tuzmukhamedov LL.M. ’94 named judge of the International Criminal Tribunal for Rwanda
International Criminal Tribunal for Rwanda.  Judge Bakhtiyar Tuzmukhamedov Sworn In

Russian judges
Living people
1955 births
Harvard Law School alumni
International Criminal Tribunal for the former Yugoslavia judges
International Criminal Tribunal for Rwanda judges
Moscow State Institute of International Relations alumni
Russian judges of United Nations courts and tribunals